The Bayer process is the principal industrial means of refining bauxite to produce  alumina (aluminium oxide) and was developed by Carl Josef Bayer. Bauxite, the most important ore of aluminium, contains only 30–60% aluminium oxide (Al2O3), the rest being a mixture of silica, various iron oxides, and titanium dioxide. The aluminium oxide must be further purified before it can be refined into aluminium metal.

Process  

Bauxite ore is a mixture of hydrated aluminium oxides and compounds of other elements such as iron. The aluminium compounds in the bauxite may be present as gibbsite 2(Al(OH)3), böhmite (γ-AlO(OH)) or diaspore (α-AlO(OH)); the different forms of the aluminium component and the impurities dictate the extraction conditions. Aluminum oxides and hydroxides are amphoteric, meaning that they are both acidic and basic.  The solubility of Al(III) in water is very low but increases substantially at either high or low pH.  In the Bayer process, bauxite ore is heated in a pressure vessel along with a sodium hydroxide solution (caustic soda) at a temperature of 150 to 200 °C. At these temperatures, the aluminium is dissolved as sodium aluminate (primarily [Al(OH)4]−) in an extraction process. After separation of the residue by filtering, gibbsite is precipitated when the liquid is cooled and then seeded with fine-grained aluminum hydroxide crystals from previous extractions.  The precipitation may take several days without addition of seed crystals.

The extraction process (digestion) converts the aluminium oxide in the ore to soluble sodium aluminate, NaAlO2, according to the chemical equation:

Al2O3  +  2 NaOH   →   2 NaAlO2  +  H2O

This treatment also dissolves silica, forming sodium silicate :

2 NaOH + SiO2   →   Na2SiO3 + H2O 

The other components of Bauxite, however, do not dissolve. Sometimes lime is added at this stage to precipitate the silica as calcium silicate. The solution is clarified by filtering off the solid impurities, commonly with a rotary sand trap and with the aid of a flocculant such as starch, to remove the fine particles. The undissolved waste after the aluminium compounds are extracted, bauxite tailings, contains iron oxides, silica, calcia, titania and some unreacted alumina. The original process was that the alkaline solution was cooled and treated by bubbling carbon dioxide through it, a method by which aluminium hydroxide precipitates:

2 NaAlO2 + 3 H2O + CO2 → 2 Al(OH)3 + Na2CO3

But later, this gave way to seeding the supersaturated solution with high-purity aluminium hydroxide (Al(OH)3) crystal, which eliminated the need for cooling the liquid and was more economically feasible:

2 H2O + NaAlO2 → Al(OH)3 + NaOH

Some of the aluminium hydroxide produced is used in the manufacture of water treatment chemicals such as aluminium sulfate, PAC (Polyaluminium chloride) or sodium aluminate; a significant amount is also used as a filler in rubber and plastics as a fire retardant.  Some 90% of the gibbsite produced is converted into aluminium oxide, Al2O3, by heating in rotary kilns or fluid flash calciners to a temperature of about 1470 K.

2 Al(OH)3 → Al2O3 + 3 H2O

The left-over, 'spent' sodium aluminate solution is then recycled. Apart from improving the economy of the process, recycling accumulates gallium and vanadium impurities in the liquors, so that they can be extracted profitably.

Organic impurities that accumulate during the precipitation of gibbsite may cause various problems, for example high levels of undesirable materials in the gibbsite, discoloration of the liquor and of the gibbsite, losses of the caustic material, and increased viscosity and density of the working fluid.

For bauxites having more than 10% silica, the Bayer process becomes uneconomic because of the formation of insoluble sodium aluminium silicate, which reduces yield, so another process must be chosen.

1.9-3.6 tons of bauxite is required to produce 1 ton of aluminum oxide. This is due to a majority of the aluminum in the ore being dissolved in the process. Energy consumption is between 7 GJ/tonne to 21 GJ/tonne (depending on process), of which most is thermal energy. Over 90% (95-96%) of the aluminium oxide produced is used in the Hall–Héroult process to produce aluminium.

Waste 
Red mud is the waste product that is produced in the digestion of bauxite with sodium hydroxide. It has high calcium and sodium hydroxide content with a complex chemical composition, and accordingly is very caustic and a potential source of pollution. The amount of red mud produced is considerable, and this has led scientists and refiners to seek uses for it. One such use is in ceramic production.
Red mud dries into a fine powder that contains iron, aluminum, calcium and sodium. It becomes a health risk when some plants use the waste to produce aluminum oxides.

In the United States, the waste is disposed in large impoundments, a sort of reservoir created by a dam. The impoundments are typically lined with clay or synthetic liners. The US does not approve of the use of the waste due to the danger it poses to the environment. The EPA identified high levels of arsenic and chromium in some red mud samples.

Ajka alumina plant accident 

On October 4, 2010, the Ajka alumina plant in Hungary had an incident where the western dam of its red mud reservoir collapsed. The reservoir was filled with 700,000 m3 of a mixture of red mud and water with a pH of 12. The mixture was released into the valley of Torna river and flooded parts of the city of Devecser and the villages of Kolontár and Somlóvásárhely. The incident resulted in 10 deaths, more than a hundred injuries, and contamination in lakes and rivers.

History of the Bayer process
The Bayer process was invented in 1888 by Carl Josef Bayer. Working in Saint Petersburg, Russia to develop a method for supplying alumina to the textile industry (it was used as a mordant in dyeing cotton), Bayer discovered in 1887 that the aluminium hydroxide that precipitated from alkaline solution was crystalline and could be easily filtered and washed, while that precipitated from acid medium by neutralization was gelatinous and difficult to wash. The industrial success of this process caused it to replace the Le Chatelier process which was used to produce alumina from bauxite.

The engineering aspects of the process were improved upon to decrease the cost starting in 1967 in Germany and Czechoslovakia. This was done by increasing the heat recovery and using large autoclaves and precipitation tanks. To more effectively use energy, heat exchangers and flash tanks were used and larger reactors decreased the amount of heat lost. Efficiency was increased by connecting the autoclaves to make operation more efficient.

A few years earlier, Henri Étienne Sainte-Claire Deville in France developed a method for making alumina by heating bauxite in sodium carbonate, Na2CO3, at 1200 °C, leaching the sodium aluminate formed with water, then precipitating aluminium hydroxide by carbon dioxide, CO2, which was then filtered and dried. This process (known as the Deville process) was abandoned in favor of the Bayer process.

The process began to gain importance in metallurgy together with the invention of the Hall–Héroult electrolytic aluminium process, invented just one year earlier in 1886. Together with the cyanidation process invented in 1887, the Bayer process marks the birth of the modern field of hydrometallurgy.

Today, the process produces nearly all the world's alumina supply as an intermediate step in aluminium production.

See also
Ajka alumina plant accident
Deville process
Hall–Héroult process
History of aluminium

References

 

Chemical processes
Aluminium industry
Metallurgical processes